The 2003 NCAA Division I Field Hockey Championship was the 23rd women's collegiate field hockey tournament organized by the National Collegiate Athletic Association, to determine the top college field hockey team in the United States. The Wake Forest Demon Deacons won their second championship, defeating the Duke Blue Devils in the final. The semifinals and championship were hosted by the University of Massachusetts Amherst at Richard F. Garber Field in Amherst, Massachusetts.

Bracket

References 

2003
Field Hockey
2003 in women's field hockey
2003 in sports in Massachusetts
Women's sports in Massachusetts